The 80th 2003 Lithuanian Athletics Championships were held in S. Darius and S. Girėnas Stadium, Kaunas on 1–2 August 2003.

Men

Women

External links 
 Lithuanian athletics

Lithuanian Athletics Championships
Lithuanian Athletics Championships, 2003
Lithuanian Athletics Championships